Madison is a city in St. Francis County, Arkansas, United States. The population was 769 at the 2010 census, down from 987 in 2000.

Geography

Madison is located at  (35.013681, -90.726919).

Demographics

As of the census of 2000, there were 987 people, 358 households, and 239 families residing in the city. The racial makeup of the city was 10.03% White, 88.96% Black or African American, 0.41% from other races, and 0.61% from two or more races.  0.81% of the population were Hispanic or Latino of any race.

There were 358 households, out of which 36.9% had children under the age of 18 living with them, 29.3% were married couples living together, 32.4% had a female householder with no husband present, and 33.2% were non-families. 30.2% of all households were made up of individuals, and 13.7% had someone living alone who was 65 years of age or older.  The average household size was 2.76 and the average family size was 3.48.

In the city, the population was spread out, with 36.4% under the age of 18, 9.6% from 18 to 24, 22.1% from 25 to 44, 21.1% from 45 to 64, and 10.8% who were 65 years of age or older.  The median age was 29 years. For every 100 females, there were 95.8 males.  For every 100 females age 18 and over, there were 73.5 males.

The median income for a household in the city was $15,700, and the median income for a family was $20,682. Males had a median income of $21,875 versus $17,500 for females. The per capita income for the city was $9,733.  About 40.4% of families and 41.9% of the population were below the poverty line, including 56.1% of those under age 18 and 50.4% of those age 65 or over.

Education
Forrest City School District operates public schools serving the community. Forrest City High School is the local high school.

Notable people
Lew Buford Brown, lawyer, politician, newspaper publisher and poet

References

Cities in Arkansas
Cities in St. Francis County, Arkansas